Alana Rene Blanchard (born March 5, 1990) is an American professional surfer and model. Blanchard has surfed on the ASP World Tour.

Career 

Alana Blanchard was first taught how to surf when she was just 4 years old by her father, Holt. Alana rode her first wave at Hanalei Pier in Kauai. Then went on to compete for the first time when she was 9 years old. Blanchard took first place in shortboard at the 2005 T&C Women's Pipeline Championships. She has also won championships in the following: 
The Women's Pipeline Championships, Hawaii 
The Rip Curl Girls Festival Junior Pro, Spain
The Roxy Pro Trials in Haleiwa, Hawaii
The Billabong Pro Pre Trials in Hookipa, Maui
The Volcom Pufferfish Surf Series in Pinetrees, Kauai.
Beginning in 2004, Blanchard also established her professional relationship with Rip Curl swimwear, in which she designed and modeled, including a line of wetsuits. In 2020, Rip Curl ended their sponsorship which Blanchard believes was due to her becoming a mother. In a statement, Rip Curl denied that this was the reason blaming it on an inability for Rip Curl and Blanchard to agree to terms of a new deal. In May 2017, the Hawaiian surfer launched the Alana Blanchard Foundation (ABF) with the goal of supporting female talent in the sport of surfing. She also has a large influence on social media with 1.8 million followers on Instagram and 102K subscribers on YouTube.

Personal life 
In 2013, Blanchard began dating Australian pro surfer Jack Freestone after they met while on the North Shore of Oahu, Hawaii. In June 2017, the couple announced that they were expecting their first child. The couple became engaged in June 2019. 

She is a long time best friend and supporter of Bethany Hamilton and was present along with her father when Hamilton suffered the shark attack that cost her her left arm at age thirteen. In the 2011 film Soul Surfer, Blanchard was portrayed by Lorraine Nicholson.

Blanchard is a vegan.

References

External links 

Living people
1990 births
American surfers
American female surfers
Sportspeople from Hawaii
World Surf League surfers
21st-century American women